The 1997 Virginia Tech Hokies football team represented the Virginia Polytechnic Institute and State University during the 1997 NCAA Division I-A football season. The team's head coach was Frank Beamer.

Schedule

Rankings

Roster

Coaching Staff
 Bud Foster - Defensive coordinator
 Rickey Bustle - Offensive coordinator
 J. C. Price - strength and conditioning
 Brent Pry - Graduate assistant

References

Virginia Tech
Virginia Tech Hokies football seasons
Virginia Tech Hokies football